Columbus Smith III, better known by his stage name Rahki (sometimes Rahki Beats), is a Grammy Award-winning American record producer and songwriter from Los Angeles, California. He is known for his work with mentor DJ Khalil and acts such as Eminem, Kendrick Lamar, Currensy, Evidence, Schoolboy Q, 50 Cent, Domo Genesis, Lecrae, Aloe Blacc, and more. In 2018, Rahki was the executive producer on Rejjie Snow's album titled, Dear Annie. Rahki was also responsible for the cover artwork for the album, and his son contributed vocals to the opening song "Hello".

Songwriting and Production credits

Accolades

Grammy Awards

|-
|rowspan="2"|2011
|Recovery (Writer, Programming & Keyboards)
|Best Rap Album
|
|-
|"Recovery" (Writer, Programming & Keyboards)
|Album of the Year
|
|-
||2013
|Gravity (Drums)
|Best Gospel Album
|
|-
|rowspan="2"|2014
|"Good Kid, M.A.A.D City" (as producer)
|Album of the Year
|
|-
|"Good Kid, M.A.A.D City" (as producer)
|Best Rap Album
|
|-
|rowspan="2"|2015
| "i"  (as producer)
|Best Rap Song
|
|-
|"Lift Your Spirit" (Drums)
|Best R&B Album
|
|-
|rowspan="2"|2016
|"To Pimp a Butterfly" (as producer)
|Album of the Year
|
|-
|"To Pimp a Butterfly" (as producer)
|Best Rap Album
|

References

 
 https://genius.com/artists/Rahki

American hip hop record producers
Living people
Musicians from Los Angeles
Musicians from California
Grammy Award winners for rap music
Record producers from California
Year of birth missing (living people)